The Sentinel Island Light is a lighthouse in Alaska adjacent to Lynn Canal.

Location
The Sentinel Island Light is at the northern entrance to the Favorite Channel, between the mainland and Lincoln and Shelter Islands. It was listed on the National Register of Historic Places on December 2, 2002.

History
On August 5, 1910, the steamship Princess May grounded on rocks just north of Sentinel Island. Although the ship was successfully taken off the rocks on September 5, 1910, photographic images showing the ship pointing in the air at low tide became famous.

The 1930s lighthouse, replacing an earlier wooden structure, was built for $35,310. It was listed on the National Register of Historic Places in 2002. Other than the lighthouse, the district included four other contributing buildings, four contributing structures, and two contributing sites.

See also

 List of lighthouses in the United States
 National Register of Historic Places listings in Juneau, Alaska

References

Sources
 Turner, Robert D., Pacific Princesses: An Illustrated History of Canadian Pacific Railway's Princess Fleet on the Northwest Coast, Sono Nis Press, Victoria, BC (1977)

External links

 
 Lighthouse Friends — Sentinel Island Lighthouse
 

1902 establishments in Alaska
Art Deco architecture in Alaska
Historic districts on the National Register of Historic Places in Alaska
Lighthouses completed in 1902
Lighthouses completed in 1935
Lighthouses on the National Register of Historic Places in Alaska
Buildings and structures on the National Register of Historic Places in Juneau, Alaska